Heritage Week (Irish: Seachtain na hOidhreachta) is an annual nationwide set of hundreds of events organized by the Heritage Council in Ireland.

They are a celebration of Ireland's culture, history, gardens, and architecture that gives visitors free access to landmarks that are either usually pay to enter or not open to the public. The week's attractions usually includes tours, events and activities related to history and culture.

Heritage Week is part of the European Heritage Days, a joint action between the Council of Europe and the European Commission.
There is a volunteer programme associated with the organization of the events.

Heritage Week is usually the last week in August.

Event guides are usually available in Tourist Offices, Libraries, Heritage Centres, Museums, Bus Stations and in many hotels. There are competitions run as part of the weeks activities and awards, nominated by the public, for the volunteers and organisations which put on the best events.

Awards
 Heritage Hero, for a person or organisation
 Hidden Heritage, for lesser known sites
 Reaching Out, for attracting new audiences
 Cool for Kids, for family events

See also 
 European Heritage Days
 Heritage Open Days in England

References

External links 
Heritage Week website

Entertainment events in Ireland
Annual events in Ireland